Cadet Inspectors (CIs) are non-commissioned officers and ex-cadets who have completed their secondary school education and volunteered to continue their service in the National Police Cadet Corps in Singapore.

Requirements 
Ex-cadets must meet these following requirements in order to be eligible to apply:

 They must have graduated from secondary school or be enrolled in a post-secondary educational institution;
 They must have held the rank of Staff Sergeant or above when they were a cadet;
 They must be physically fit (pass a medical examination) and have a Body Mass Index (BMI) of 27.5 or less;
 They must possess all the following badges:

 2nd Class Drill;
 Campcraft;
 Adventure Training Camp;
 Police Knowledge;
 Total Defence;

5. and have any one of the following badges:

 Marksmanship
 Community Safety and Security Programme
 Swimming
 Kayaking

Details 
Ex-cadets who want to become CIs must apply for entry into the course through their Unit's Officer Commanding and then attend the 3-week long Cadet Inspectors' Basic Training Course (CIBTC) held twice every year in June and December at the Home Team Academy and NPCC Camp Resilience in Pulau Ubin. During CIBTC, they will hold the rank of Cadet Inspector Trainee [CIT (NPCC)] and attend lectures teaching them about Cadet Inspectorship. Upon completion of the course, they will pass out and attain the rank of Probationary Cadet Inspector [P/CI (NPCC)].

After passing the probation requirements, they will attain the rank of Cadet Inspector [CI (NPCC)].

Cadet Inspectors who have served in the Corps for at least 2 years are eligible for promotion to the rank of Senior Cadet Inspector [SCI (NPCC)].

The rank insignia for CIT (NPCC) is one white stripe, while P/CI (NPCC) and CI (NPCC) is one white stripe and a pip, while SCI (NPCC) is two white stripes and a pip.

Uniform 
The uniform worn by a Cadet Inspector is similar to that of a Cadet, with some slight differences:

Do note that the following differences are for the No. 3 Working Attire dress.

Opportunities 
Cadet Inspectors are given the opportunity to return to their secondary school to continue teaching cadets there. They are also given the opportunity to participate in Area events, like their Area's Adventure Training Camp, Survival Training Camp and Secondary One Swearing-in Ceremony, Headquarters events like shooting competitions and the NPCC Annual Parade, and National events like the National Day Parade.

References

Singapore Police Force